Operation Migration was a nonprofit, charitable organization, which developed a method using ultralight aircraft to teach migration to captive-raised, precocial bird species such as Canada geese, trumpeter swans, sandhill cranes, and endangered whooping cranes.

Background
Operation Migration Canada was founded in 1994 as a Canadian registered charity. Operation Migration-USA Inc was established in 1999 as a 501(c)(3) nonprofit organization.

In collaboration with the Whooping Crane Eastern Partnership, Operation Migration participated in the reintroduction of endangered Whooping cranes into eastern North America beginning in 2001 and continuing until the last small flock was lead south in 2015.

It is believed by conservationists that approximately 500–1,400 whooping cranes existed in 1860. Their population declined because of hunting and habitat loss until 1941 when the last migrating flock dwindled to an all-time low of 15 birds; all birds of this species alive today are descendants of this flock.

The wild flock has slowly increased to 506 in 2021. This flock winters in and around Aransas National Wildlife Refuge on the Texas Gulf Coast. In spring, they migrate north, nesting in Wood Buffalo National Park, which straddles the border of Alberta and Northwest Territories in Canada. This flock of whooping cranes is the only naturally occurring wild population in the world. Scientists have long recognized the risk of having all of the wild whooping cranes using one wintering and breeding location. With all the wild birds concentrated in one small area, the population could be wiped out by disease, bad weather, or human impacts. Whooping crane survival depends on additional, separated populations.

Operation Migration helped to establish a reintroduced population which migrates along an eastern pathway; this group has 81 individuals as of 2021. With an additional 79 individuals considered wild and non-migratory and 136 individuals in captivity, there are 802 whooping cranes in the world as of data collected in 2021.

Imprinting, training, and releasing cranes
The whooping crane chicks are transported to Wisconsin in June where they are conditioned to follow ultralight aircraft in preparation for their fall migration to wintering grounds in Florida. Pilots lead the birds on training flights over the White River Marsh State Wildlife Area in Green Lake County, Wisconsin throughout the summer to build the birds' stamina. Each year since 2001, a class of cranes has been led on their first migration south from Wisconsin to Florida's Gulf Coast.

Beginning in 2005 the ultralight-led migration was supplemented with a second reintroduction technique called Direct Autumn Release (DAR). Young cranes are released in small groups with older, now wild whooping cranes, with the intent that they will learn the migration route from these more experienced birds. After learning the migration route by following the ultralight aircraft or older cranes to the wintering areas, the young cranes make the return flight to their summering grounds in the north on their own the following spring.

In December 2011, the Operation Migration escorting nine cranes was interrupted by the Federal Aviation Administration due to a regulation prohibiting paid pilots of ultralight aircraft. After a month with the cranes kept in a pen, the FAA finally granted a one-time exemption to allow completion of the migration.

On January 22, 2016, the United States Fish and Wildlife Service announced that after the 2016 season it would end its support of the use of ultralight aircraft to lead whooping cranes from Wisconsin to the Florida Gulf Coast each autumn. A conclusion by experts in whooping crane biology that human intervention such as ultralight flights and costumed humans helping to care for chicks has impaired the ability of the cranes to learn the parenting skills necessary to raise chicks in the wild prompted the Fish and Wildlife Service's announcement: Despite the release of 250 whooping cranes in Wisconsin in 2001 – of which 93 survived in January 2016 – only 10 chicks have fledged and survived to adulthood and, since 2005, only five breeding pairs have produced chicks that were born in the wild and fledged. Agreeing with the need to minimize human interaction with chicks, the International Crane Foundation supported the Fish and Wildlife Service's decision, although Operation Migration opposed it, claiming that the ultralight flights nonetheless help whooping cranes to survive.

See also

 Bill Lishman, co-founder who first led birds with ultralight aircraft
 Fly Away Home, feature film inspired by Lishman's work

References

Further reading
Operation Migration online Field Journal
Lishman, William. Father Goose. Crown, 1996. .
 Whooping Crane Eastern Partnership

External links
 Operation Migration archived website at Internet Archive

Ornithology in the United States
Ornithology in Canada
Ornithological organizations
Bird conservation